Kinne may refer to:

People 
 Derek Godfrey Kinne, British soldier
 Frances Kinne (1917–2020), American author, academic administrator, and musician
 G. J. Kinne (born 1988), American football quarterback
 John Baxter Kinne (1877–1954), American soldier
 Otto Kinne (1923–2015), German biologist
 Ryan Kinne (born 1989), American soccer player
 Sharon Kinne (born 1939), American murderer
 Thomas J. Kinne (born 1961), German TV game show personality
 W. B. Kinne (1874–1929), American politician

Places
 Cape Kinnes, Antarctic geographic feature
 Kinne Cemetery, in Griswold, Connecticut, United States

Sweden 
 Kinne Hundred, a hundred of Västergötland in Sweden
 Kinne Quarter Hundred, a hundred of Västergötland in Sweden
 Kinnevald Hundred,  a hundred of Småland in Sweden

Other uses 
 Kinne Tonight (Australian TV series)
 Kinne (Australian TV series)

See also

 Kenney (disambiguation)
 Kenny (disambiguation)
 Kinney (disambiguation)
 Kinnie (disambiguation)

Surnames from given names